Brandon Loschiavo (born 31 May 1997) is an American diver. He qualified to represent team USA in the 2020 Summer Olympics, competing in the Men's 10m Platform event.

Career highlights

References

External links
 Purdue Boilermakers bio

1997 births
Living people
American male divers
Olympic divers of the United States
Divers at the 2020 Summer Olympics
Purdue Boilermakers men's divers
Sportspeople from Huntington Beach, California